The 2011–12 FC Kuban Krasnodar season was the first season back in the Russian Premier League, the highest tier of football in Russia, following relegation to the Russian National Football League at the end of the 2009 season. Kuban finished the season in 8th position, their best ever finish, whilst also reaching the Round of 32 in the Russian Cup, where they were defeated by Dynamo Bryansk.

Squad
 

 (C)

Transfers

Winter 2010–11

In:

Out:

Summer 2011

In:

Out:

Winter 2011–12

In:

Out:

Competitions

Russian Premier League

First phase

Matches

League table

Championship group

Matches

League table

Russian Cup

2011–12

Squad statistics

Appearances and goals

|-
|colspan="14"|Players away from Kuban Krasnodar on loan:

|-
|colspan="14"|Players who left Kuban Krasnodar during the season:

|}

Goal scorers

Disciplinary record

References

FC Kuban Krasnodar seasons
Kuban Krasnodar